Pittsfield Township is one of the eighteen townships of Lorain County, Ohio, United States. As of the 2010 census the population was 1,581.

Geography
A portion of the city of Oberlin cuts into the northern part of the township but is a separate municipality. At the center of Pittsfield Township is the intersection of State Routes 58 and 303.

Located in central Lorain County, it borders the following townships and city:
New Russia Township - north
Oberlin - north
Carlisle Township - northeast corner
LaGrange Township - east
Penfield Township - southeast corner
Wellington Township - south
Brighton Township - southwest corner
Camden Township - west
Henrietta Township - northwest corner

Demographics
According to the United States Census Bureau, in 2000 Pittsfield had 1,549 residents with an average age of 39.33 years. The population density was 22.77 per square kilometer (58.96 per square mile). There were 576 housing units. The median household income was $54,750 and the per capita income was $22,470.

Name and history
It is the only Pittsfield Township statewide.

Pittsfield Township was part of the Connecticut Western Reserve. There were white settlers before 1813 but they left. Milton Whitney, one of the large landowners in the area, arranged for settlers to move in in 1821. In 1831, the township was separated from Wellington Township and named Pittsfield after Pittsfield, Massachusetts, Milton Whitney's original home. The township government was organized in 1832.

On April 11, 1965, one of the tornadoes in the Palm Sunday tornado outbreak passed through Pittsfield, killing seven people and destroying every building in the town.

Government
The township is governed by a three-member board of trustees, who are elected in November of odd-numbered years to a four-year term beginning on the following January 1. Two are elected in the year after the presidential election and one is elected in the year before it. There is also an elected township fiscal officer, who serves a four-year term beginning on April 1 of the year after the election, which is held in November of the year before the presidential election. Vacancies in the fiscal officership or on the board of trustees are filled by the remaining trustees.

References

Further reading
Wright, G. Frederick.  A Standard History of Lorain County, Ohio.  Chicago: Lewis, 1916.

External links

County website
Pittsfield Township Historical Society
The 1965 tornado

Townships in Lorain County, Ohio
Townships in Ohio